Rufus Matthew Jones (January 25, 1863 – June 16, 1948) was an American religious leader, writer, magazine editor, philosopher, and college professor.  He was instrumental in the establishment of the Haverford Emergency Unit (a precursor to the American Friends Service Committee). One of the most influential Quakers of the 20th century, he was a Quaker historian and theologian as well as a philosopher. He is the only person to have delivered two Swarthmore Lectures.

Early life and education
Jones was born into an old Quaker family in South China, Maine where he attended services at the Pond Meeting House and then the newer South China Meeting House. In 1885 he graduated from Haverford College in Pennsylvania, and stayed on to earn his M.A. there in 1886. From 1893 to 1912 he was the editor of the Friends' Review (later called The American Friend); from this position he tried unsuccessfully to unite the divided body of Quakers. In 1901 Jones received another M. A., from Harvard. He also began teaching philosophy and psychology at Haverford in 1893 and continued to do so until retiring in 1934. From 1898 to 1936 he served on the board of trustees of Bryn Mawr College.

Career
In 1917 he helped found the American Friends Service Committee. In 1927 Jones took a trip to Asia at the invitation of the YMCA.  His main purpose was to address missionaries in China, but he made stops in Japan, India, and Palestine as well.  While in India, Jones visited Mahatma Gandhi and the birthplace of the Buddha. This trip helped Jones formulate a new approach to mission – that of giving humanitarian aid to people while respecting other religions and not aggressively converting people to one's own religion. In 1938 he went with George Walton and D. Robert Yarnall on a mission to Nazi Germany to try to help Jewish people there after the Kristallnacht.

Jones worked hard at soothing some of the hurt from the 19th Century split among Friends and had some success. Jones wrote extensively on the topic of mysticism, which is one of the chief aspects of the Quaker faith. In 1948, he was awarded an honorary Doctor of Letters (Litt.D.) degree from Whittier College.

He distinguished between negating or negative mysticism (making contact with an impersonal force) and affirming or affirmative mysticism (making contact with a personal being). He upheld that God is a personal being with whom human beings could interact. He wrote in The Trail of Life in the Middle Years, "The essential characteristic of [mysticism] is the attainment of a personal conviction by an individual that the human spirit and the divine Spirit have met, have found each other, and are in mutual and reciprocal correspondence as spirit with Spirit." At the same time that he distinguished between negative and affirmative mysticism, he asserted that all negative mystics occasionally take the affirmative approach and that all affirmative mystics tread the negative path from time to time. He exerted a major influence on the life and work of theologian Howard Thurman, who studied with him from 1929–1930.

Jones was a member of the Laymen's Commission that toured mission fields in Asia and produced Re-Thinking Missions: A Laymen's Inquiry after One Hundred Years (1932). The conclusions of this inquiry reflect his views as outlined above.

Jones died in 1948 at age 85, in Haverford, Pennsylvania.

Bibliography
Books
Eli and Sybil Jones: Their Life and Work. Philadelphia: Porter & Coates, 1889.
Practical Christianity. Philadelphia: John C. Winston & Co., 1899.
The Society of Friends in Kennebec County, Maine. New York: H.W. Blake & Co., 1892.
A Dynamic Faith. London: Headley Brothers, 1901.
Fourth edition. London: Headley Brothers, 1920.
Social Law in the Spiritual World: Studies in Human and Divine Inter-Relationship. Philadelphia: John C. Winston Co., 1904.
Practical Christianity, new and enlarged edition. Philadelphia: John C. Winston Co., 1905.
The Double Search: Studies in Atonement and Prayer. Philadelphia: John C. Winston Co., 1906.
The Abundant Life, 1908.
Studies in Mystical Religion. London: Macmillan and Co., 1909.
Second edition. London: Macmillan and Co., 1919.
Stories of Hebrew Heroes. Illustrated by George Soper. London: Headley Brothers, 1911.
The Quakers in the American Colonies. London: Macmillan and Co., 1911.
A Boy's Religion from Memory. Philadelphia: Ferris & Leach, 1913.
Spiritual Reformers in the 16th and 17th Centuries. London: Macmillan and Co., 1914.
The Inner Life. New York: The Macmillan Company, 1916.
Second edition. New York: The Macmillan Company, 1917.
St. Paul the Hero. New York: The Macmillan Company, 1917.
The World Within. New York: The Macmillan Company, 1918.
The Story of George Fox. New York: The Macmillan Company, 1919.
A Service of Love in War Time: American Friends Relief Work in Europe, 1917-1919. New York: The Macmillan Company, 1920.
The Remnant. London: The Swarthmore Press, 1920.
The Later Periods of Quakerism, 1921
Spiritual Energies in Daily Life, 1922.
The Church's Debt to Heretics, 1924?.
Finding the Trail of Life. New York: The Macmillan Company, 1926.
The Faith and Practice of the Quakers, 1927.
The Trail of Life in College. New York: The Macmillan Company, 1929.
Some Exponents of Mystical Religion, 1930.
Pathways to the Reality of God, 1931.
A Preface to Christian Faith In a New Age, 1932.
The Trail of Life in the Middle Years . New York: The Macmillan Company, 1934.
The Testimony of the Soul, 1936.
The Eternal Gospel, 1938.
The Flowering of Mysticism, 1939.
Spirit in Man, 1941.
A Small-Town Boy, 1941.
The Radiant Life, 1944.
The Luminous Trail, 1947.
A Call to what is Vital, 1948.
The Luminous Trail
New Eyes for Invisibles
Articles, Lectures and Pamphlets
"Historical Sketches of Yearly Meetings, No. 1: Baltimore Yearly Meeting", The Friends Review, November 30, 1893.
"The Message of Quakerism: Two Addresses." London: Headley Brothers, 1901.
"The Atonement." 1905.
"Quakerism: A Religion of Life." The first Swarthmore Lecture, delivered May 18, 1908. London: Headley Brothers, 1908.
"Quakerism: A Religion of Life." Second edition. London: Headley Brothers, 1912.
"A More Excellent Way." New York: Association Press, 1916.
"The Quakers." In The Religious History of New England: King's Chapel Lectures. Cambridge: Harvard University Press, 1917.
"Religion as Reality, Life and Power." William Penn Lectures. Philadelphia: Walter H. Jenkins, 1919.
"The Nature and Authority of Conscience." The Swarthmore Lecture, delivered August, 1920. London: The Swarthmore Press, 1920.
"Mystical Experience." In The Atlantic Monthly, May 1942.
As Editor
George Fox, an autobiography; edited with an introduction and notes by Rufus M. Jones. Philadelphia: Ferris & Leach, 1903.
Second edition. Philadelphia: Ferris & Leach, 1919.
The Beginnings of Quakerism, by William C. Braithwaite; with an introduction by Rufus M. Jones. London: Macmillan and Co., 1912.
Selections from the Writings of Clement of Alexandria. London: Headley Brothers, 1914.
Present Day Papers: A Monthly Journal for the Presentation of Vital and Spiritual Christianity. Volume 1. Haverford, PA, 1914.
The Record of a Quaker Conscience: Cyrus Pringle's Diary; with an introduction by Rufus M. Jones. New York: Macmillan, 1918.

See also
American philosophy
List of American philosophers
Rufus M. Jones also authored "SOME PROBLEMS OF LIFE" Copyright MCMXXXVII.  Set up, Electrotyped, Printed, and Bound By The Parthenon Press at Nashville Tennessee, U. S. A.  Later reprinted by Cokesbury.  Thank You Don J. Hewett, Pastor ret.

Online Books Page: Jones, Rufus Matthew (1863-1948).

Further reading
Bernet, Claus: "Rufus Jones (1863-1948). Life and Bibliography of an American Scholar, Writer, and Social Activist. With a Foreword by Douglas Gwyn", New York 2009, 
Endy, Melvin B.: "The Interpretation of Quakerism. Rufus Jones and His Critics", in: Quaker History. The Bulletin of Friends’ Historical Association, 62, 1, 1981, 3-21
Hedstrom, Matthews: "Rufus Jones and Mysticism for the Masses", in: Cross Currents, Summer 2004.
Kent, Stephen: Psychological and Mystical Interpretations of Early Quakerism. William James and Rufus Jones. In: Religion. A Journal of Religion and Religions, 17, 1987, 251–274.
Vining, Elizabeth Gray: Friend of Life. Philadelphia 1958. London 1959.

References

External links
 
 

 

Profile at Quakers in the World
Profile at Christian Mystics
"The Trail of Life in the Middle Years," 1934 at Haverford College Quaker & Special Collections
Rufus Matthew Jones material in Jones-Cadbury family papers at Haverford College Quaker & Special Collections.

1863 births
1948 deaths
19th-century Christian mystics
20th-century Christian mystics
American Quakers
American philosophers
American historians
American male non-fiction writers
Bryn Mawr College
Protestant mystics
Christian writers
Haverford College alumni
Harvard University alumni
Psychology educators
People from China, Maine
Historians of Quakerism
Quaker theologians
Quaker writers
American magazine editors

da:Rufus Jones